General Posey may refer to:

Alexander Posey (general) (born c. 1794), Illinois Militia brigadier general
Carnot Posey (1818–1863), Confederate States Army brigadier general 
Thomas Posey (1750–1818), Continental Army brigadier general